Presidential elections were held in Chile on 4 October 1931. The result was a victory for Juan Esteban Montero of the Radical Party, who received 64% of the vote.

Electoral system
The election was held using the absolute majority system, under which a candidate had to receive over 50% of the popular vote to be elected. If no candidate received over 50% of the vote, both houses of the National Congress would come together to vote on the two candidates who received the most votes.

Results

References

Presidential elections in Chile
1931 in Chile
Chile
October 1931 events